Lusik Aguletsi; born Lusik Zhorzhiki Harutyunyan; was a Nakhichevan-born Armenian painter, ethnographer, and Honored Cultural Worker of Armenia.

Aguletsi was famous for being the last Armenian to regularly wear her traditional Armenian dress in Yerevan.

Biography 
Lusik Aguletsi was born on May 31, 1946, in the village of Verin Agulis in Nakhichevan, to the Harutyunyan family; the last Armenians living in Agulis after the 1919 Agulis  massacre committed by the Azerbaijanis. Her experience in Agulis was the inspiration for the character “Lusik” in the novel Stone Dreams by Azerbaijani author Akram Aylisli. In 1953, Aguletsi’s family moved to Yerevan. In 1963-1967, she studied at the Panos Terlemezyan Art College of Yerevan. During her studies, she was awarded a special prize by the "Avangard" newspaper. She was a member of the Artists' Union of Armenia from 1974.

Lusik Aguletsi's paintings are in museums and private collections abroad. In addition to painting, Aguletsi was an active ethnographer. She collected weapons, costumes, decorations, and ancient jars. Some of them were brought from her native Agulis and the rest from different corners of Western and Eastern Armenia.

Lusik Aguletsi died on July 13, 2018 at the age of 72.

Exhibitions 
From 1968, Aguletsi participated in various republican exhibitions in Armenia and abroad.

Solo exhibitions 
 1996  National Gallery of Armenia
 1997  Stepanakert
 1997  "Mkrtchyan" exhibition hall
 1999  Greece, Thessaloniki

Group exhibitions 
 1977  Paris
 1977  USA
 1978  Germany
 1981  Iraq
 1983  Los Angeles, Detroit, Toronto, Montreal
 1985  Moscow
 1986  Japan
 1987  Greece
 1989  "Armenian Artists to the Hayastan All-Armenian Fund", National Gallery of Armenia
 1994  Belgium, Normandy, France
 1995, 1997  Symposium in Artsakh
 1998  "Contemporary Art on the Threshold of the 21st Century"
 2003  Minsk, exhibition dedicated to the Independence Day of Armenia
 2003  Exhibition dedicated to the "Armenia-Diaspora" conference

Awards and prizes 

 1967  Award at the Transcaucasian Exhibition
 1968  The first prize of the exhibition of women artists
 1975  Prize of the Academy of Fine Arts of the Moscow All-Union Exhibition
 Diploma of the RA Ministry of Culture
 Diploma of Yerjan Municipality
 2003  Award for preserving universal values by the Mesrop Mashtots Cultural Center
 2010  Movses Khorenatsi medal
 2011  Lusik Aguletsi's book "Relics of the Past" won the main prize at the 4th Republican Book Art Awards, and also won the first prize in the "Book of Art" category of the CIS International Book Awards.
 2014  Honored Cultural Worker of Armenia
 2014  Gold medal of the mayor of Yerevan

Lusik Aguletsi House-Museum 

The house on 79 Muratsan Street in Yerevan, where Lusik Aguletsi lived and worked for about 45 years, was turned into a house-museum on the initiative of family members. In the museum, folk concerts, painting, dance and master classes are organized. Adjacent to the museum is the Aguletsi Art Cafe, which features traditional Armenian cuisine with Agulis dishes.

Quotes

Work 
 Lusik Aguletsi "Relics of the Past", Yerevan, 2010.
 Lusik Aguletsi "Yuri Samvelyan", Yerevan, 2012.

Literature 
 Lusik Aguletsi-Samvelyan, Yerevan, 2004, 90 pages.
 Nazik Armenakyan, Armenian festive culture according to the works of painter Lusik Aguletsi, Yerevan, 2015, 408 pages.

References

External links 
 Lusik Aguletsi interview about Akram Aylisli (hetq.am)

1947 births
2018 deaths
Ethnic Armenian painters
Armenian women painters
Soviet women artists
Soviet artists
People from Nakhchivan